Melittiphis is a genus of mites in the family Laelapidae.

Species
 Melittiphis alvearius (Berlese, 1895)

References

Laelapidae